New IP refers to a set of proposals for a novel framework for a future Internet Protocol backed by Huawei and its subsidiary Futurewei which have notably been introduced to the ITU and the IETF and presented at various IEEE conferences  between 2018 and 2020.

The proposals have received severe criticism, being labeled as "dystopian"  and "authoritarian"  by the international press while the ICANN noted that, if implemented, they could "make pervasive monitoring much easier".

Huawei subsequently tried to address some of these criticisms in an online article.

There have further been arguments that later proposals including Future IP Evolution and Future Vertical Communication Networks were simply a rebranding of the New IP proposals.

See also 
 IPv9 (China)

References 

Internet layer protocols